Petchia is a genus of plant in the family Apocynaceae, first described as a genus in 1926. It is native to Madagascar, Cameroon, the Comoros and Sri Lanka.

Species

 Petchia africana Leeuwenb. - Cameroon
 Petchia ceylanica (Wight) Livera - Sri Lanka
 Petchia cryptophlebia (Baker) Leeuwenb. - Madagascar
 Petchia erythrocarpa (Vatke) Leeuwenb. - Comoros, Madagascar
 Petchia humbertii (Markgr.) Leeuwenb. - Madagascar
 Petchia madagascariensis (A.DC.) Leeuwenb. - Madagascar
 Petchia montana (Pichon) Leeuwenb. - Madagascar
 Petchia plectaneiifolia (Pichon) Leeuwenb. - Madagascar

References

 
Apocynaceae genera